Timothy ("Tim") Francis Sullivan, OAM (born 16 September 1975) is an Australian Paralympic athlete.

Personal 
Sullivan as born in Melbourne, Australia. When Tim was eight years old, he was riding his bike to the Park with his sister and a friend, when they where approached by a couple of kids. One had a broken glass bottle and was threatening them. They started to chase Sullivan with the bottle, due to this he ran on to the rode and was struck by a car. From this accident Sullivan suffered cerebral palsy. It limits his verbal communication: he speaks in tiny, fast sentences and sometimes one word answers It has also limited the use of the right side of his body. 

These fact are true as told by his sister Jackie. The other information was wrong

Career 

Tim Sullivan, is an Australian athlete who has won ten gold medals at the Paralympic Games. This includes five gold medals at the 2000 Summer Paralympics in Sydney (T38 200m; T38 100m; T38 400m; T38 4X400m relay; T38 4X100m relay), in which he received a Medal of the Order of Australia for his 'service to sport'. Tim also won four gold medals at the 2004 Summer Paralympics in Athens, in the T38 100m, 200m and 400m events, and as a member of the men's 4 × 100 m Relay team. In addition to the gold medals won, Sullivan also set world records in the 100m, 200m and 4 × 100 m relay at the 2004 Athens Paralympic Games. At the conclusion of the 2004 Paralympic Games in Athens, Tim was ranked 1st overall among athletes in his competitions.

Tim represented Australia again at the 2008 Summer Paralympics in Beijing, where he won a gold medal in the men's 4 × 100 m T35-38 and also at the 2012 Summer Paralympics in London.

He held the Australian record for the highest gold medal count until being surpassed by Matthew Cowdrey in 2012.

Tim did not medal at the 2012 Games.

Recognition 
In 2000, Sullivan was named Male Athlete of the Year by the Australian Paralympic Committee. In the same year, Sullivan also received the Victorian Institute of Sport's Award of Excellence.

In October 2004, he was named "Paralympian of the Year" by the Australian Paralympic Committee. In 2004, Sullivan was also awarded the Victorian Institute of Sport's Athlete With a Disability award.

See also
Athletes with most gold medals in one event at the Paralympic Games

References

External links
 Timothy Sullivan at Australian Athletics Historical Results

1975 births
Living people
Paralympic athletes of Australia
Athletes (track and field) at the 2000 Summer Paralympics
Athletes (track and field) at the 2004 Summer Paralympics
Athletes (track and field) at the 2008 Summer Paralympics
Athletes (track and field) at the 2012 Summer Paralympics
Paralympic gold medalists for Australia
Recipients of the Medal of the Order of Australia
Medalists at the 2000 Summer Paralympics
Medalists at the 2004 Summer Paralympics
Medalists at the 2008 Summer Paralympics
Paralympic medalists in athletics (track and field)
Australian male sprinters